Balussery is a town located about 25 km northeast of Kozhikode city and lies on the side of State Highway 34. It is one of the 12 block Panchayats in Kozhikode district. Balussery is the Northeast side entry of Calicut city.

Geography and Climate 
Balussery is located at a distance of about 25 km away from Kozhikode, the district headquarters, and is well connected by road to the nearby towns. There are three main roads that span out from the Balussery city centre. Kozhikode is accessible by two routes, via the Balussery-Kozhikode main Road and the Balussery-Ulliyeri-Kozhikode Road. The major city Thamarassery is about 15 km away and can be reached by the Koyilandi Edavanna Road,  and Koyilandi Town is about 16 km away. The town has a bus stand-cum-shopping complex and acts as the origin of the bus services to all the main surrounding places.

Overview 
Balussery block has an area of 278.54 km2. There are eight Grama Panchayats in the block: Atholi, Balussery, Koorachundu, Kottur, Naduvannur, Panangad, Ulliyeri and Unnikulam.  The total population is 212,592: 105,962 males and 106,631 females.

Government offices are situated in the heart of the town. Kerala State Electricity Board has a 33 kV substation (at Manjappalam), a division office/subdivision, and a section office here. There is also an employment exchange at Balussery Mukku, a Kerala Police Circle office, a PWD office, a Sub Registrar Office, an Educational Department Office, six co-operative banks, State Bank of India, Canara Bank, Syndicate Bank, Punjab National Bank, Federal Bank and Bank of Baroda.

Regular bus services operate throughout Kozhikode, Thamarassery, Koyilandy,  Koorachundu, Koottalida and Perambra. Mini-buses connect the hinterland to Balussery Town. KSRTC operates services to the hilly regions of Balussery, like Mankayam, Koorachundu, Kakkayam, Kallanode, Cheekkilode, and Vayalada.

Education 
There are three government higher secondary schools located in Balussery. Govt. Vocational Higher Secondary School and GHSS girls high school are near the town, and Kokkallur HSS is 3 km away from town. There are also primary and upper primary schools, like Balussery GLP school, A.L.P School Thuruthyad.

There is a central government institute named Adarsha Sanskrit Vidya Peetham, located in Vaikundam. It is one of several Sanskrit Colleges in Kerala.

PT Usha School of Athletics is at Vattoli Bazaar. Saraswathy Vidya Mandir is situated 2 km away from Balussery.

Politics 
Balussery has always been the most influential constituency of the LDF. Most of the workers are from CPIM. The Left Front has been winning with a huge lead in successive assembly and panchayat elections. As of the 2021 assembly elections, the current MLA is Adv K.M Sachindev of CPI(M) and he got a massive lead of 20372 votes The opposite candidates are Dharmajan Bolgaty for UDF and Libin Balussery for NDA. Other political parties in the area are Muslim League, Indian National Congress, BJP, NCP, Janata Dal, welfareparty, and SDPI.

Notable people 
 Ranjith -Director
Girish Puthenchery- Lyricist
Sarasa Balussery- Actress

Anoop Menon- Actor

Places of interest 
Vayalada Hill Station

Vayalada Hill Station is a hill station in Balussery in the proximity of Vettakkorumakan Temple.And its popularly knowns as Gavi of Malabar.

Thonikadavu Tourist Place

Thonikadavu is a tourist place located in Balussery,its called as Switzerland of Kerala. 

Pokkunnu Hills View Point

Pokkunnu Hills View Point, Commonly known as Pokkunnu Mala, is a hill station in Balussery

Balussery-Kotta and Manjapuzha River

Balussery is home to the Central Fort of Kurumbranad Rajas, the Balussery Kota. It is flanked by a temple dedicated to Vettakkorumakan, known as the largest Vettakkorumakan Temple anywhere. It is 2 km from the bus stand. The Manjapuzha River flows by the side of the temple. There are several small temples nearby, such as Kunnatheru Maha Ganapathy Temple, Ponnaram Theru Maha Ganapathy Temple, Chamundeshwari Temple, Vaikuntam Vishnu Temple, Chinthramangalam SreeKrishna Temple, Ellath Mookambika Temple, and Narasimha Kshetram Nirmaloor. Thekkedathu Nagathan Kavu are also here.

Kinaloor Estate (Cochin Malabar Estates)

Kinaloor Estate (Cochin Malabar Estates) is a valley with a mountain on one side and a rubber plantation on the other. There is a plane in the middle of the plantation and the mountain, a proposed site for the KSIDC (SEZ) industrial area.

The Usha sports school is located at Kinaloor estate, Vattoli Bazaar. The school is located here at Kinaloor estate, Vattoli Bazaar, around 5 km from Balussery.

Kakkayam Dam Site

Kakkayam power station and dam is the sole dam in this region. The powerhouse is around 19 km from Balussery, and the dam is around 35 m

Transportation
Balussery connects to other parts of India through Koyilandy. The national highway no.66 passes through Koyilandy, and the northern stretch connects to Mangalore, Goa, and Mumbai.

Suburbs of Balussery
 Atholi, Balussery, Panangad and Koorachundu
 Kottur, Naduvannur, Kayanna and UIliyeri
 Unnikulam, Padanilam, Madavoor, Narikkuni, Punnassery and Nanmanda
 Kokkallur

References 

 Cities and towns in Kozhikode district
 Koyilandy area